Andrei Stepanov (born 18 April 1999) is a Russian cyclist. He was selected to compete in the time trial at the 2020 UCI Road World Championships.

Major results
2019
 1st  Time trial, National Under-23 Road Championships
 1st Stage 7 Friendship People North-Caucasus Stage Race
 10th Overall Five Rings of Moscow
2021
 National Under-23 Road Championships
1st  Time trial
2nd Road race
 1st Stage 2 Samara Stage Race
2022
 1st Overall Five Rings of Moscow

References

1999 births
Living people
Russian male cyclists